Khevid  or Khavid may refer to:
 Khevid Jan
 Khevid-e Mobaraki